You Are Forgiven is the debut mixtape by American hip hop recording artist MadeinTYO. It was originally released on April 27, 2016 by Privateclub Records on DatPiff, then it was re-released on August 19, 2016 on iTunes by Privateclub Records. You Are Forgiven features production from MadeinTYO himself, along with K Swisha, Richie Souf, Purps and ICYTWAT. It features guest appearances from 2 Chainz and Travis Scott. The mixtape was supported by the singles "Uber Everywhere", and "I Want".

Singles
"Uber Everywhere" was released as the mixtape's lead single on February 26, 2016. It was produced by K Swisha.

"I Want" was released as the mixtape's second single on July 14, 2016. It features a guest appearance from 2 Chainz and was produced by Richie Souf.

Track listing

Charts

References 

2016 mixtape albums
MadeinTYO albums